The Estación de Fotobiología Playa Unión (EFPU) (in English: 'Playa Unión Photobiology Station') is a non-profit organization, devoted to scientific research about the effects of ultraviolet radiation on aquatic ecosystems.

Location 

EFPU is located at Playa Unión, Chubut province, Argentina.

External links
Website of Estación de Fotobiología Playa Unión.

Research institutes in Argentina